Doli Saja Ke Rakhna is a 2022 romantic comedy Bhojpuri film directed by Rajnish Mishra. It stars Khesari Lal Yadav and Amrapali Dubey. The film is based on the emotional bond between a father and a son.

Plot

Cast
 Khesari Lal Yadav
 Amrapali Dubey
 Raksha Gupta

Music
The song Piya Ji Ke Muski (lit. Beloved's Smile) was released in September 2022 on YouTube. Sung by Priyanka Singh, it crossed 78 million views, as of February 2023.

Release

The film released on 2 September 2022 in more than hundred screens in India and Nepal with 25 Multiplexes and got positive response from the audience.

References

2020s Bhojpuri-language films